Henry Demarest Lloyd (May 1, 1847 – September 28, 1903) was a 19th-century American progressive political activist and pioneer muckraking journalist. He is best remembered for his exposés of the Standard Oil Company, which were written before Ida M. Tarbell's series for McClure's Magazine.

Biography

Early years
Henry Demarest Lloyd was born on May 1, 1847, in the home of his maternal grandfather on Sixth Avenue in New York City. Henry was the first child of Aaron Lloyd, a graduate of Rutgers College and New Brunswick Theological Seminary and minister of the Dutch Reformed Church, and Maria Christie ( Demarest) Lloyd.

One of Lloyd's strongest formative influences was the preaching of Henry Ward Beecher, whose sermons he regularly attended.

Lloyd attended Columbia College and Columbia Law School. Lloyd worked at a library and taught to pay his way through school. Upon graduation, Lloyd was admitted to the New York state bar in 1869.

Journalistic career

In 1872, Lloyd joined the staff of the Chicago Tribune, gaining promotion to the position of chief editorial writer in 1875. He remained at the paper until 1885.

Lloyd was one of the precursors to the later muckraker journalists,  writing a searing exposé of the monopolistic abuses of John D. Rockefeller's Standard Oil Trust, "The Story of a Great Monopoly," published in the March 1881 issue of The Atlantic. He later fleshed out his case against the unbridled corporate power of Standard Oil and similar corporations in his best-known book, Wealth Against Commonwealth, published in 1894. Lloyd's work thus preceded Ida Tarbell's more famous 1904 work, "The History of Standard Oil," by a number of years.

Political career

As a political activist, Lloyd defended the Haymarket anarchists in 1886, a position that caused his father-in-law, William Bross, publisher of the Tribune, to disinherit him and his wife Jessie Bross. However, William Bross and his only daughter must have made amends, because he died in her home.

Lloyd, after leaving the newspaper, continued to file stories as a free-lancing dispatcher, using the Associated Press wires, and his publications of outrage over the treatment of miners in the Spring Valley dispute are credited with ending that episode. Lloyd also wrote and spoke on behalf of Milwaukee streetcar operators in 1893, and anthracite coal miners in 1902.

Lloyd was a leading citizen of Winnetka, Illinois. Elected more than once as a Village trustee and member of the Board of Education, he served as vice-president of the Village council from 1884 to 1886, and as Village treasurer in 1887 and 1888. He was president of the Town Meeting in 1898 and is credited with a leading role in pioneering what became known nationally as the "Winnetka system" of self-government, a reform cause broadly taken up by Samuel Gompers and the labor movement.

In 1894, Lloyd ran for United States Congress as a candidate of the People's Party, the so-called "Populists." In subsequent years he was supportive of the aims of the Socialist Party of America, although he was never an active member of the organization.

Death and legacy

Henry Demarest Lloyd, remembered by a contemporary as the "pioneer and leader" of the trust-busting progressive movement, died on September 28, 1903. He was survived by a son, William Bross Lloyd, who would emerge as a founding member and early leader of the Communist Labor Party of America in 1919.

After his death, Lloyd's library, which included thousands of books and pamphlets relating to trade unionism, cooperation, socialism, and monopolies, was donated to the University of Wisconsin.

Lloyd was an inspiration to a generation of young investigative journalists and radical political activists, such as Charles Edward Russell, who later recalled:

"As the Standard Oil article in the Atlantic became the armory of every person willing to fight for industrial freedom, so Wealth Against Commonwealth in later years became the great storehouse of information to which numbers of able campaigners habitually resorted for their facts. Probably millions of men read or heard Mr. Lloyd's ideas without being aware of the real authorship. But I judge that with this condition he was well content. No man ever entered such a fight with a smaller share of personal vanity to gratify. He desired that his countrymen should be informed of existing conditions, but not that he himself should gain fame or rewards."

In recognition of Lloyd's work, the Center for Investigative Reporting launched the "Henry Demarest Lloyd Investigative Fund" in 2009 to provide grants to investigative journalists.

The Henry Demarest Lloyd House in Winnetka is now a National Historic Landmark.

See also
 Florence Kelley, a social reformer inspired by Lloyd
 Carolyn Lloyd Strobell, Lloyd's sister and biographer

Footnotes

Works
For a complete list of works see Lloyd (1912), pp. 351-364

Further reading

 Chester M. Destler, Henry Demarest Lloyd and the Empire of Reform. Philadelphia: University of Pennsylvania Press, 1963.
 Richard Digby-Junger, The Journalist as Reformer: Henry Demarest Lloyd and Wealth Against Commonwealth. Westport, CT: Praeger, 1996.
 Peter J. Frederick, Knights of the Golden Rule: The Intellectual As Christian Social Reformer in the 1890s. Lexington, KY: University Press Of Kentucky, 1976.
 Jay E. Jernigan, Henry Demarest Lloyd. Boston: Twayne Publishers, 1976.
 Caro Lloyd, Henry Demarest Lloyd, 1847-1903: A Biography. In two volumes: Vol. 1 and Vol. 2. Introduction by Charles Edward Russell. New York: G.P. Putnam's Sons, 1912.
 George H. Shibley, Death of Noted Majority Rulist - Facts Concerning His Life and the Movement, The National New Era, vol. 20, no. 43 (October 1903), pg. 12.
 John L. Thomas, Alternative America: Henry George, Edward Bellamy, Henry Demarest Lloyd, and the Adversary Tradition. Cambridge, MA: Harvard University Press, 1983.

External links

"Henry Demarest Lloyd," Columbia College website.
"Henry Demarest Lloyd," Spartacus Educational.
"Henry Demarest Lloyd," Modern History sourcebook.

1847 births
1903 deaths
Journalists from New York City
Politicians from New York City
American male journalists
American investigative journalists
Standard Oil
History of the petroleum industry in the United States
St. Mark's School (Massachusetts) alumni
Columbia College (New York) alumni
Columbia Law School alumni
Illinois Populists
Illinois city council members
School board members in Illinois
Activists from New York City